El Buh is a town in the northeastern Sanaag region of Somaliland.

El Buh is located in the Badhan District. The town was briefly a part of the Maakhir administration in the late 2000s which mainly covered Badhan District area's, until it was  officially incorporated into the Somaliland authority since late 2007.

In May 2019, The Somaliland Justice Minister visits El Buh. Residents welcome him.

In February 2020, Puntland's military procurement and medical teams has been deployed to the El Buh military base.

Notes

References
Minister of Women and Family Affairs of Puntland visited Elbuh
Ceelbuh

Populated places in Sanaag
Cities in Somaliland
Archaeological sites in Somaliland